A glirarium is a terracotta container used for keeping edible dormice.  These animals were considered a delicacy in the Etruscan period and later in the Roman Empire.

Description 
The container consists of a vessel, usually in terracotta, perforated to allow the passage of air, polished on the inside to prevent escape and with a lid to seal the top. Inside there are two or more shelves placed against the vessel walls and additional holes in the bottom of the vessel, generally more numerous than those on the sides.  By inducing hibernation via darkness and confinement, the glirarium would cause the dormouse to fatten.

References

External links 
The Dormouse Hollow (biology of the dormouse)
Wandering Italy (blog) on glirarium

Archaeological artefact types
Etruscan ceramics
Ancient Roman pottery
Dormice
Buildings and structures used to confine animals
Livestock herding equipment